Léia Akcelrad Lerner de Scheinvar is a Brazilian-Mexican botanist. She has dedicated her work to studying and protecting Mexico's cacti.

Early life and education
Scheinvar was born in Brazil on 30 September 1954.

She received her doctorate in biology from the UNAM Faculty of Sciences in 1982.

Career
She is responsible for the Laboratorio de Cactáceas in the botanical garden of UNAM.

References

External links
 La extinción de los cactus from México Desconocido

Brazilian emigrants to Mexico
20th-century Brazilian botanists
Mexican botanists
Academic staff of the National Autonomous University of Mexico
Women botanists
1954 births
Living people